Teleférico da Providência is a gondola lift service operating in the Central region of Rio de Janeiro, Brazil. The cable car runs between Central do Brasil and Gamboa, Rio de Janeiro, servicing the unofficial neighborhood of  Providência.

Opening
The cable car service was opened on 2 July 2014 by Mayor of Rio de Janeiro Eduardo Paes. At opening the operating hours were 9:00am–11:00am with plans to phase in increased operating hours of 6:00am–9:00pm on weekdays; 7:00am–7:00pm on Saturdays; and 9:00am–6:00pm on Sundays and holidays. The cable car service closed in December 2016 and has not resumed service since then.

References

Aerial tramways in Brazil
Public transport in Rio de Janeiro (city)
2014 establishments in Brazil